Christian Brassington (born 6 June 1983) is an English actor and writer, best known for playing the odious vicar Ossie Whitworth in the third and fourth series of the BBC hit period drama Poldark. Brassington also portrayed a young Boris Johnson in the More4 documentary drama When Boris Met Dave (2009), having previously played a young Tony Blair for Channel 4 in 2006.

Early life and education 
Brassington was born on 6 June 1983 in Wellington, Shropshire, England. He spent much of his youth in Basingstoke, going to the local comprehensive Brighton Hill Community School and then to Queen Mary's College. He also attended a stage school run by his father Colin Flaherty. Determined to become an actor, he studied at London's prestigious Webber Douglas Academy of Dramatic Art.

Career 
He made his on-screen debut in the BBC's police procedural drama The Cops back in 1999 and got his big break shortly after graduation in Tony Blair: Rock Star (2006), a Channel 4 docudrama recreating the days when the former British Prime Minister Tony Blair's ambition was to be on stage. A year later, the young Brassington starred opposite Cate Blanchett as Charles II, Archduke of Austria in Elizabeth: The Golden Age (2007), and in 2009 he followed up his part as Blair with a portrayal of the then Foreign Secretary Boris Johnson as a younger man in When Boris Met Dave, an account of how Johnson and David Cameron's lives became intertwined.

Brassington welcomes all kinds of roles as long as they are interesting and challenging. In an interview with PBS, he said, "I think you get yourself into trouble if you start thinking about what people's reactions are going to be while you're playing them". His portrayal of the loathsome Reverend Ossie Whitworth in the third and fourth series of the BBC historical drama Poldark (2015–2019) is possibly one of his most recognisable roles. In order to prepare for the part, he had to gain 30 pounds. According to Digital Spy, he said, "Normally actors have to get into shape for a role rather than out of it, but Osborne is described as a large character and a man of a huge appetite, so there was no getting around that. I had to gain a lot of weight."

In 2020, Brassington made his debut as a screenwriter and director with a short film called Screening, starring David Tennant, Georgia Tennant and Stephen Mangan. He also has written Doctor Who audio dramas "Neon Reign" (2018) and "Altered Status" (2021) from Big Finish Productions.

In 2022, he appeared as prison officer Dean in Catherine Tate's six-part mockumentary sitcom Hard Cell, released on Netflix.

Filmography

FIlm

Television

References

External links

1983 births
Living people
Alumni of the Webber Douglas Academy of Dramatic Art
Actors from Shropshire
People from Wellington, Shropshire
English male television actors
English male film actors